Trump card may refer to:

 Trump (card games), a playing card elevated above its normal rank
 Trump cards, or Major Arcana, a suit in the tarot deck
 Trump Card, a 1990 American game show
 The Trump Card, a 2007 Irish game show
 Trump Card (2009 film), a Bollywood thriller film
 Trump Card (2020 film), an American political documentary film
 The Trump Card (film), a 1942 French crime drama film
 The Trump Card (book), by Ivanka Trump

See also
Trump (disambiguation)